Hawthorne–Feather Airpark  is a privately owned public-use airport located three nautical miles (6 km) south of the central business district of Hillsborough, in Hillsborough County, New Hampshire, United States. The airport is situated in Deering, New Hampshire. It was formerly used by Hawthorne College in Antrim, New Hampshire to train student pilots.

Facilities and aircraft 
It has one runway designated 2/20 with an asphalt surface measuring 3,260 by 75 feet (994 x 23 m).

For the 12-month period ending 7 August 2014, the airport had 3,000 general aviation and 600 military aircraft operations, an average of 300 per month. At that time there were 10 aircraft based at this airport: 90% single-engine and 10% ultralight.

The airport provides Avgas and outhouses. Radio frequencies are 122.800 Mhz. The airport is open all year long (in the winter, depending on conditions and snow conditions, skis may be used alongside the paved runway). Located on the east side of the runway is a large hangar that holds multiple planes, but space to rent is limited.  Weather service is held at Jaffrey Airport – Silver Ranch Airpark.

References

External links 
 Hawthorne–Feather Airpark at New Hampshire DOT
 Aerial image as of 12 April 1998 from USGS The National Map
 

Airports in New Hampshire
Transportation buildings and structures in Hillsborough County, New Hampshire